The Dry Run Bridge is a historic structure located in the unincorporated community of Littleport, Iowa, United States. Around the turn of the 20th-century Clayton County contracted with various firms and individuals to build bridges across its rivers, streams and ditches. Short spans like this one generally had a timber stringer structure. They were inexpensive, but they didn't last long. They were eventually replaced by steel stringer structures. For the most part, that transition did happen until after 1900. That makes this steel stringer bridge, erected in 1898, quite rare. It is the oldest known structure of its kind in Iowa. A.C. Boyle was paid $184.50 to erect the bridge. In 1907 A.J. Nading was paid $471 to build two new stone abutments. This bridge was listed on the National Register of Historic Places in 1998.

References

Bridges completed in 1898
Bridges in Clayton County, Iowa
National Register of Historic Places in Clayton County, Iowa
Road bridges on the National Register of Historic Places in Iowa
Steel bridges in the United States